The 2017 Super Taikyu Series is the 26th season of the Super Taikyu Series. The season will start on 1 April at Twin Ring Motegi and end on 15 October at Okayama International Circuit.

Teams and drivers

ST–X

ST–TCR

ST–1

ST–2

ST–3

ST–4

ST–5

Calendar and results

Championship standings

Notes:
† – Drivers did not finish the race, but were classified as they completed over 75% of the race distance.

References

External links
 Official website of the Super Taikyu Series

Super Taikyu Series
Super Taikyu Series